Adolf Faustine Mkenda (born in 1963 in Rombo, Kilimanjaro), is a Tanzanian Minister of Education, Science, and Technology, having previously served as Minister of Agriculture. An associate professor of Economics at the University of Dar es Salaam and a politician who presently serves as a Chama Cha Mapinduzi's Member of Parliament for Rombo constituency since November 2020.

Political career
After the 2020 Tanzanian general election, Mkenda was appointed as the Minister of Agriculture in both 5th Cabinet of Tanzania and 6th Cabinet of Tanzania. Before this appointment he served in various capacities as Permanent Secretary Ministry of Natural Resources and Tourism (2019-2020), Permanent Secretary Ministry of Foreign Affairs and East Africa Cooperation (2018-2019) & Permanent Secretary Ministry of Industry, Trade and Investment (2017-2018). Following Magufuli's second term, Mekda was appointed as the Minister of Agriculture a post he held through various reshuffles. In January 2022, Mkenda was appointed Minister for Education, Science, and Technology.

References

External links 

Living people
1963 births
Tanzanian educators
Tanzanian environmentalists
University of Dar es Salaam alumni
21st-century Tanzanian politicians
Chama Cha Mapinduzi politicians
Chama Cha Mapinduzi MPs
Tanzanian MPs 2020–2025
Government ministers of Tanzania
Ministers of agriculture of Tanzania
People from Kilimanjaro Region
University of Gothenburg alumni